Caroli is a Latin and Italian surname that may refer to:

Angelo Caroli (1937–2020), Italian football player
Daniele Caroli (born 1959), Italian cyclist
Germana Caroli (born 1931), Italian singer
Gösta Caroli (1902–1975), German spy
Guido Caroli (born 1927), Italian speed skater
Pierre Caroli (1480–1550), French refugee and religious figure
Rodolfo Caroli (1869–1921), Italian bishop, nuncio to Bolivia 
Rolf Caroli (1933–2007), German boxer

See also

Carli (given name)
De Carolis
Caroly (name)

Italian-language surnames
Latin-language surnames
Patronymic surnames
Surnames from given names